Kontora Kooka or Kontora Kuka is a Russian rock music group formed in Samara in the early 1990s. According to Rolling Stone Russia, their album Check was the best Russian album of 2013.

Band history 
The band has three members. Vladimir 'Kook' Elizarov is the band's ideologist, as well as a vocalist, guitarist, percussionist, and lyricist. Danila Telegin, a guitarist and singer, is the second member. The third member of the group, Viktor Gurov, is responsible for programming drum machines, noises, keyboard, and other electronic musical instruments.

In 2000, their first album was released under the title Kontora Kooka. The band's second album, Renovation, was released in 2004 by the Geometry music label. Critics compared Kontora Kooka's music to The Residents and other little-known post-rock bands. In 2006, the band recorded an industrial album named Ordnung, which was influenced by Einstürzende Neubauten.

Between 2006 and 2007, the band performed new material at a number of concerts and began looking for a new sound. Around this time, Timur Taziev joined the band and took control of drums. In 2009, the band released LO-END after working on it for two years. The album became a cult hit among fans of the group. 

The album Jazz Virus was released in the spring of 2012. That same year, the cover of the album won the Red Dot design award.

In early 2013, Danila Telegin left the group to  start his own project, TLGN. The album CHECK was recorded in that year. After a long break, Oleg Sadovnikov returned to the group. According to Andrey Bukharin of Rolling Stone Russia, CHECK was one of the top ten albums and the best Russian album of 2013.

Middle Volga was released in 2014. Most of the lyrics are based on Russian folklore.

On November 24, 2015, the album RIO was released. Valeria Pikalova, the leader of Synesthesia, who previously collaborated with teams such as Adora VEGA and Purple Fog Side, took part in the recording of the album. Union Concern named Rio one of the top twenty domestic albums of 2016.

Just one year later, on 29 November 2016, the band released the album Karachun. RuTracker.org selected the title track for their annual collection of the best tracks of 2016. The song "Baba-Lebeda" from the album got a spot on the annual compilation "ArtSovet Rutracker.org 2016 Essentials Titanium Block".

Kontora Kooka released the album Mein lieber friend on September 19, 2017. Album featured by Aleksey Mogilevsky (ex-Nautilus Pompilius, Sax). Union Concern named it the best album of the year and web portal NNeFormat ranked it one of the top ten albums of the year.

On October 16, 2019, featuring the project HaKu (HQ), twin guitarists Isaev, the album "Forst-Zinna" is released.

Discography

Studio albums

References

External links 
Kontora Kooka on Kroogi.com
Kontora Kooka on Bandcamp.com
Kontora Kooka on SoundCloud
Kontora Kooka on discogs.com
Kontora Kooka on musicbrainz

Russian rock music groups
Russian new wave musical groups
Russian experimental musical groups
Musical groups from Samara
Soviet rock music groups